HiPac (stylized as HIPAC) (pronounced as high-pack), is an audio tape cartridge format, introduced in August 1971 on the Japanese consumer market by Pioneer and discontinued in 1973 due to lack of demand. In 1972 it only achieved a market share of 3% in equipping new cars. In the mid 1970s, the format was repurposed as a children's educational toy called  and was used in the analog tape delay "Melos Echo Chamber".

Cartridge 
The second program is recorded in the same direction as the first, unlike the Compact Cassette.

There are two specified tape speeds: 60 minutes at 1⅞ ips or ~4.8 cm/s, and 30 minutes at 3¾ ips or ~9.5 cm/s. The tape speed is detected automatically by a notch in the cartridge's case. The slower of these tape speeds is identical to the Compact Cassette.

HiPac Council 
In addition to Pioneer, the following companies participated.
 Apollon Music Industry (Apron Ongaku Kōgyō, from 2010 Bandai Music Entertainment)
 Clarion
 Kodansha
 Sharp Corporation
 Tokyo Shibaura Electric (Toshiba)
 Toshiba Music Industry (EMI Music Japan)
 Nippon Columbia
 Hitachi, Ltd.
 Mitsui Bussan Home Appliance Sales

References

External links 
 Techmoan: Hipac - The lost tape : Pioneer's forgotten 1970s cassette rival, YouTube, 29 September 2017

Audio storage
Tape recording
Discontinued media formats
1971 in music
1971 in technology
Products introduced in 1971